The FEU Lady Tamaraw Booters are the varsity women's football team of the Far Eastern University. They compete at the University Athletic Association of the Philippines (UAAP), as well as at the PFF Women's League, the top flight domestic women's football league in the Philippines.

By winning Season 76 of UAAP in 2014 which is their ninth title, the FEU Lady Tamaraws became the collegiate team in the UAAP to have the most titles in women's football. The added to the record by winning again in Season 77.

They have also won the PFF Women's Cup twice. The first being the inaugural in 2014 and the second one being in 2015.

2016 squad

 

Source: Pinay Futbol

Officials
As of 3 December 2016

Honors
UAAP Football Championship
Champions: 10 (1996–97, 1997–98, 2000–01, 2001–02, 2006–07, 2007–08, 2010–11, 2012–13, 2013–14, 2014–15)

PFF Women's Cup
Champions: 2 (2014 , 2015)

See also
FEU Tamaraws

References

Lady
University Athletic Association of the Philippines football teams
Women's football clubs in the Philippines
PFF Women's League clubs